Yu-Gi-Oh! VRAINS is the sixth main anime series in the Yu-Gi-Oh! franchise. It is produced by Gallop and broadcast by TV Tokyo. The series is directed by Masahiro Hosoda. The series follows Yusaku Fujiki and takes place in a high school environment in Den City. The series features Charisma Duelists who use VR and are similar to YouTubers. The show's theme is "Let's take one step forward and try it!" This season uses two theme songs.

The English dub of the season aired in Canada on Teletoon (episodes 104-108) from January 31, 2021 to February 28, 2021.
first premiered in Australia on 9Go! (episodes 109–120) from August 27, 2021 to September 13, 2021

Episode list

Notes

References

VRAINS (season 3)
2019 Japanese television seasons